Kismayo University is a private university located in Kismayo, Somalia's third largest city.

Background
Since the collapse of the Somali central government in 1991, all the educational institutions and other public properties were destroyed. This has caused a mass migration of Somali intellectuals from the country. Years later, some of the Somali intellectuals recognized the need of primary and secondary education. Consequently, non-profit making organizations have been established to meet the educational needs of those who graduated from local schools in the war torn country. In responding to the mentioned situations, Kismayo University was founded in the coastal City of Kismayo to be the first university ever established in the Jubaland region of Somalia.

Founders of the university, administrators and policymakers want to hold on to young people leaving the city to find higher education elsewhere. The founding of Kismayo University in September 2005, created 20+ postsecondary spaces. The obvious result will be opportunity for university education for local high school graduates and adults who would like to continue their education in the region instead of going to Mogadishu, Hargeisa, or neighboring Kenya.

The main campus just north of Kismayo, next to the Old Kismayo Airport, was built in 2009.

Governance and management
The Supreme governance bodies of the university are made up of:

Board of Trustees
University Senate
Academic Council
Operations Board
Development Board

Faculties
Faculty of Economics and Management Sciences
Bachelor of Business Administration
Bachelor of Accounting
Bachelor of Public Administration
Faculty of Computer Studies
Bachelor of Computer Science
Bachelor of Information Technology 
Faculty of Medicine and Health Sciences
Bachelor of General Nursing
Bachelor of Medicine and Health Sciences
Bachelor of Public Health
Faculty of Sharia and Law
Bachelor of General Figh
Bachelor of Usul-fiqhi
Bachelor of Al-kitab & Sunnah
Bachelor of Law
Faculty of Education
Bachelor of Islamic studies & Arabic language
Bachelor of Social science (History/Geography)
Bachelor of Sciences (Bio/Ch & Math/Phy)
 
Source:

Memberships
Somali Research and Education Network (SomaliREN) 
Association of African Universities (AAU)
Arab States Research and Education Network (ASREN)
Association of Somali Universities

Partnerships
Kenyatta University, Kenya 
Makerere University, Uganda
Islamic University In Uganda, Uganda
Kampala University, Uganda

Accreditation
Kismayo University is registered as a private, non-profit higher education institution under the Ministry of Education, Higher Education and Culture (Somalia).

References

External links
 Kismayo University Official website
 KISMAYO UNIVERSITY
  SOMALI UNIVERSITY RANKING (Jaamacada Kismaayo | Kismayo University)

Universities in Somalia
Kismayo
2005 establishments in Somalia
Educational institutions established in 2005